The Qassam rocket ( Ṣārūkh al-Qassām; also Kassam) is a simple, steel artillery rocket developed and deployed by the Izz ad-Din al-Qassam Brigades, the military arm of Hamas. These rockets cannot be fired to target specific military objectives in or near civilian areas, and are "indiscriminate when used against targets in population centers".

Three models have been produced and used, the first being introduced in 2001. More generally, all types of Palestinian rockets fired into southern Israel, for example the Palestinian Islamic Jihad Al Quds rockets, are called Qassams by the Israeli media, and often by foreign media.

History of the Qassam

Name
Qassam rockets are named after the Izz ad-Din al-Qassam Brigades, the armed branch of Hamas, itself named for Izz ad-Din al-Qassam, a Syrian Muslim preacher whose death during a guerrilla raid against British Mandatory authorities in 1935 was one of the catalysts for the 1936–39 Arab revolt in Palestine.

Rocket launches
The production of Qassams began in September 2001 following the outbreak of the Second Intifada. The first time Palestinians launched rockets into Israel, rather than at an Israeli settlement in the Gaza Strip, occurred on February 10, 2002. One of the rockets landed in Kibbutz Saad. Two Qassam rockets landed in the southern Israeli city of Sderot, the first city hit, on March 5, 2002. Some rockets have hit as far as the edge of Ashkelon. By the end of December 2008, a total of 15 people had been killed by Palestinian rockets since attacks began in 2001. Since 2000, Palestinian rockets, which include the Qassam, alongside others such as the Grad rocket, have been used to kill 22 Israeli citizens and one Thai national (as of January 9, 2009).

Rocket, design and cost

Rocket

The Qassam rocket is the best-known type of rocket deployed by Palestinian militants, mainly against Israeli civilians, but also some military targets during the Second Intifada of the Israeli–Palestinian conflict. According to Human Rights Watch, Qassam rockets are too inaccurate and prone to malfunction to be used against specific military targets in or near civilian areas, and are mainly launched for the purpose of "harming civilians".

Design
The utility of the Qassam rocket design is assumed to be ease and speed of manufacture, using common tools and components. To this end, the rockets are propelled by a solid mixture of sugar and potassium nitrate, a common fertilizer. The warhead is filled with smuggled or scavenged TNT and urea nitrate, another common fertilizer. The warhead's explosive material is similar to the civilian explosive ammonite.

The rocket consists of a steel cylinder, containing a rectangular block of the propellant. A steel plate which forms and supports the nozzles is then spot-welded to the base of the cylinder. The warhead consists of a simple metal shell surrounding the explosives, and is triggered by a fuse constructed using a simple firearm cartridge, spring and a nail.

Early designs used a single nozzle which screwed into the base; later rockets use a seven-nozzle design, with the nozzles drilled directly into the rocket baseplate. This alteration both increases the tolerance of the rocket to small nozzle design defects, and makes manufacture easier by allowing the use of a drill rather than a lathe during manufacture (because of the smaller nozzle size). However, the interior cone shape of each of the seven nozzles requires use of a lathe, since drilled holes would be cylindrical rather than conical (see rocket engine nozzle). Unlike many other rockets, the nozzles are not canted, which means the rocket does not spin about its longitudinal axis during flight. While this results in a significant decrease in accuracy, it greatly simplifies manufacture and the launch systems required.

Cost 
The cost of the materials used for manufacturing each Qassam is up to $800 or €500 (in 2008–2009) per rocket.

Reaction

Israeli 

The introduction of the Qassam rocket was unexpected by Israeli politicians and military experts, and reactions have been mixed. In 2006, the Israeli Ministry of Defense viewed the Qassams as "more a psychological than physical threat." A 2008 study found that over half of Sderot's residents have been hurt, either physically or psychologically by the use of Qassams. The Israel Defense Forces has reacted to the deployment of the Qassam rockets by deploying the Red Color early warning system in Sderot, Ashkelon and other potential targets placed at risk. The system consists of an advanced radar that detects rockets as they are being launched, and loudspeakers warn civilians to take cover between 15 and 45 seconds before impact in an attempt to minimize the threat posed by the rockets. A system called Iron Dome, designed to intercept the rockets before they can hit their targets, has been in use since March 2011. A system based on lasers (Nautilios) was researched in a joint Israeli-American project in the early 2000s, but was discontinued.

Palestinian 
The Palestinian president Mahmoud Abbas stated "There is no justification for rockets from Gaza or anywhere else". He later added "Rocket attacks are in vain because they do not bring peace any closer."

Ibrahim Khreisheh, the Palestinian envoy to the United Nations Human Rights Council (UNHRC), stated in an PA TV interview on July 9, 2014 (translated by MEMRI) that indiscriminate Hamas rockets from densely populated residential areas are "crimes against humanity", while Israeli strikes are legal responses.

From others
According to a public document issued in July 2014, Amnesty International "has documented that Palestinian armed groups have stored munitions in and fired indiscriminate rockets from residential areas in the Gaza Strip, and available evidence indicates that they continue to do both during the current hostilities, in violation of international humanitarian law (..) Under international humanitarian law, (..) Parties to the conflict must also take necessary precautions to protect civilians in their power from the effects of attack. This includes avoiding, to the maximum extent feasible, co-locating military objectives in the vicinity of densely populated civilian neighbourhoods. This means the parties should avoid endangering civilians by storing ammunition in, and launching attacks from, populated civilian areas."

Human Rights Watch issued an analysis, stating, that "such weapons are therefore indiscriminate when used against targets in population centers. The absence of Israeli military forces in the areas where rockets have hit, as well as statements by leaders of Palestinian armed groups that population centers were being targeted, indicate that the armed groups deliberately attacked Israeli civilians and civilian objects." Furthermore, the public document by Human Rights Watch stated, that "Hamas, the ruling authority in Gaza, is obligated to uphold the laws of war and should appropriately punish those responsible for serious violations". The international community considers indiscriminate attacks on civilians and civilian structures that do not discriminate between civilians and military targets as illegal under international law.

An online clock timer, developed by Aaron Friedman and Yehonatan Tsirolnik, that automatically resets when Palestinian rocket attacks on Israel occur, uses information from the IDF Home Front Command system and counts time up from the last Palestinian rocket attack on Israel. It displays how long Israel has been rocket-free and shows the summed-up total numbers of Palestinian rocket attacks on Israel. "Israel has been under non-stop rocket attacks for years (..) Whenever a rocket is fired, it restarts. Sadly, this counter never really gets above an hour", Friedman said on July 18, 2014, during the 2014 Israel–Gaza conflict. An amateur YouTube video, showing the Israeli Iron Dome defense system at a military checkpoint near a crossing into Gaza taking out multiple Qassam rockets was uploaded in 2014.

Similar Palestinian rockets

Other Palestinian militant groups have also developed home-made rockets. The media generally refer to all Palestinian high-trajectory rockets as "Qassam rockets" or "Qassam missiles", while they call most rockets fired from Lebanon "Katyushas", as a Katyusha is not a specific model but rather a generic class of rocket.

 Palestinian Islamic Jihad – Al Quds 101 & 2
 Popular Resistance Committees – al Nasser-3
 Tanzim – Saria-2
 Fatah – Kafah

The Israeli Intelligence and Terrorism Information Center estimated that in 2007 the proportions of rockets fired were:
 34% – Palestinian Islamic Jihad
 22% – Hamas
  8% – Fatah
  6% – Popular Resistance Committees
 30% – unknown

The Intelligence and Terrorism Information Center reports that the number of Palestinian rockets fired per year were:

 2001:   4
 2002:  35
 2003: 155
 2004: 281
 2005: 179
 2006: 946
 2007: 896
 2008: 2,048

See also
 Ababeel1
 Improvised artillery in the Syrian Civil War

References

External links

GlobalSecurity.org – Qassam Rocket
The Homemade Rocket That Could Change The Mideast – By Tony Karon, TIME Online Edition (10 February 2002)
Qassam-2 missile a wild card in Mideast conflict – CNN (March 5, 2002)
Gaza rockets kill two in Israel, BBC article (June 28, 2004)
A Visit to a Gaza Rocket Factory,   by Ulrike Putz, der Spiegel international (January 29, 2008, in English)
Katyusha & Qassam Rockets on www.aerospaceweb.org
Photos: Qassam rockets in Sderot
 Gaza's Bottle Rockets - Why Hamas' Arsenal Wasn't Worth a War (2014-08-03), Mark Perry, Foreign Affairs
 Gabi Siboni, The Operational Aspects to Fighting the Qassam, "Military and Strategic Affairs", Volume 9, No. 3, November 2006.

Second Intifada
Hamas
Islamic Jihad Movement in Palestine
Fatah
Rocket artillery
Rocket weapons of Palestine
Gaza Strip
Insurgency weapons
Palestinian inventions